Mariticide (from Latin maritus "husband" + -cide, from caedere "to cut, to kill") literally means the killing of one's own husband. It can refer to the act itself or the person who carries it out. It can also be used in the context of the killing of one's own partner. In current common law terminology, it is used as a gender-neutral term for killing one's own spouse or significant other of either sex. The killing of a wife is called uxoricide.

Prevalence
According to Centers for Disease Control and Prevention, mariticide made up 30% of the total spouse murders in the United  States, data not including proxy murders conducted on behalf of the wife. FBI data from the mid-1970s to mid-1980s found that for every 100 husbands who killed their wives in the United States, about 75 women killed their husbands indicating a 3:4 ratio of mariticide to uxoricide.

English common law
Under English common law it was a petty treason until 1828, and until it was altered under the Treason Act 1790 the punishment was to be strangled and burnt at the stake.

Notable instances

Historical

 Laodice I allegedly poisoned her husband Antiochus II Theos of the Seleucid dynasty around 246 BC.
 Livilla, along with her lover Sejanus, probably poisoned her husband Drusus the Younger.
 The Roman emperor Claudius was allegedly poisoned by his wife Agrippina the Younger to ensure the succession of her son Nero
 Jean Kincaid (1579–1600) was a Scottish woman who was convicted of mariticide. Her youth and beauty were dwelt upon in numerous popular ballads, which are to be found in Jamieson's, Kinloch's, and Buchan's collections.
 Mary Hobry (1688), decapitated her abusive husband.
 Mary Channing (1706), a Dorset woman who poisoned her husband to be with her lover.
 Marie-Josephte Corriveau, 1763, New France
 The Black Widows of Liverpool, Catherine Flannigan (1829–1884) and Margaret Higgins (1843–1884) were Scottish sisters who were hanged at Kirkdale Gaol in Liverpool, for the murder of Thomas Higgins, Margaret's husband.
 Rebecca Copin (1796–1881) attempted to murder her husband in Virginia by putting arsenic in his coffee. While the jury agreed that she attempted mariticide in 1835, they did not grant her husband a divorce.
 Florence Maybrick (1862–1941) spent fourteen years in prison in England after being convicted of murdering her considerably older English husband, James Maybrick, in 1889.
 Tillie Klimek claimed to have psychic powers by predicting her husbands' deaths, but was proven after the attempted murder of her fifth husband that she was poisoning them with arsenic.
 Edith Thompson and Frederick Bywaters were executed in 1923 for the murder of Thompson’s husband Percy.
 Annie Walsh became the last woman to be executed in Ireland, in 1925, having murdered her husband.
 Betty Broderick shot and killed her ex-husband, Daniel, and his new wife, Linda, in 1989 while they were sleeping in their home.
 Heather Osland drugged and had her son kill her husband in 1991, creating a test case for the battered woman syndrome defense in Australia.
 Katherine Knight (b. 1955) murdered her de facto husband in October 2001 by stabbing him, then skinned him and attempted to feed pieces of his body to his children. She was sentenced to life in prison without parole: her appeal against this sentence as too harsh was rejected.
 Sheila Garvie, convicted in 1968 of the murder of Maxwell Garvie, her husband
 In 1983, musician Felix Pappalardi was shot and killed by his wife Gail Collins Pappalardi.
 In 1991, Pamela Smart had her husband murdered by a student of hers. Though the student committed the murder, the courts ruled that Smart had been guilty of mariticide due to her influence on the young man and her convincing manner to get him to carry out the act.
 In 1998, entertainer Phil Hartman was killed by his wife Brynn Hartman, who then killed herself.
 In 2000, Denise Williams of Tallahassee, Florida, conspired with her lover, Brian Winchester, to kill her husband, Mike Williams. She collected a $2 million insurance payment Winchester had arranged for the couple and then later married him. After they divorced several years later, Winchester, following his arrest after an incident where he sneaked into her car and held her at gunpoint, told police where the body had been buried; the information led to Williams' conviction in 2018.
 In 2003, Susan Wright tied her husband, Jeff, to a bed and stabbed him multiple times with two different knives.
 In 2004, Jamila M'Barek paid her brother to murder her husband, Anthony Ashley-Cooper, 10th Earl of Shaftesbury.
 Mary Winkler (born 1973) was convicted of voluntary manslaughter in the 2006 shooting of her husband, Matthew Winkler (19742006), a minister, in Tennessee.
 Travis Alexander (19772008) was an American salesman who was murdered by his ex-girlfriend, Jodi Ann Arias (born 1980), in his house in Mesa, Arizona. Arias was convicted of first-degree murder in 2013 and was sentenced to life in prison without the possibility of parole in 2015.

Mythological
In Greek mythology
 Clytemnestra murders her husband Agamemnon as an act of vengeance for the sacrifice of their daughter Iphigeneia, and to retain power after his return from Troy. In Aeschylus' Oresteia, the Erinyes consider Orestes' matricide a greater crime than Clytemnestra's mariticide, since the killing of a spouse does not shed familial blood, but the opposite view is espoused by Aeschylus's Athena.
 The Danaïdes were 50 sisters who were forced into marriage. All but one murdered their husbands on their wedding night.

In fiction

Comics
 Lorina Dodson (the Spider-Man villain White Rabbit) killed her husband after feeling treated as a trophy wife.

Films
 In Dead Alive Vera drowned her husband because he had an affair with a woman.
 In Addams Family Values, Deborah "Debbie" Jellinsky attempted unsuccessfully to kill her third husband Fester Addams after she killed two of her other husbands and ran off with their money.
 In the neo-noir film, The Last Seduction, Bridget Gregory murders her estranged husband, Clay Gregory, and frames her lover, Mike Swale, for not only his murder, but for raping her.
 In the black comedy film To Die For, Suzanne Stone-Maretto had her husband, Larry Maretto, murdered by seducing and manipulating her under-age teen lover, Jimmy Emmett, into doing it, under the guise that he was abusive to her, but in reality, her husband was putting starting a family over supporting her career.

Literature
 In Friday the 13th: Pamela's Tale Pamela Voorhees kills her husband Elias Voorhees in order to protect their younger only son Jason Voorhees.
 In "Lamb to the Slaughter", a housewife kills her husband by hitting him with a lamb leg.
 In the Ancient Chinese novel Water Margin, Pan Jinlian poisoned her husband, Wu Dalang, with her lover Ximen Qing.

Television
 In the second season of the TV series Supergirl in episode "Distant Sun", Queen Rhea of Daxam murders her husband, King Lar Gand of Daxam when Lar Gand, against his wife's wishes, allowed their son, Mon-El to return to Earth to be with his then-girlfriend, Kara Danvers.
 In the television series Once Upon a Time, Queen Regina arranged the death of her husband, King Leopold, in order to take over his kingdom.

Video Games
 In Sly 2: Band of Thieves, Bentley explains in a voice-over that the Contessa had married a Czech general, who mysteriously died a few weeks after the wedding; the general is heavily implied to have been poisoned by his wife, as the cutscene showing his wedding has green bubbles coming from his wine glass.
 Much later on, in Sly Cooper: Thieves in Time, Bentley discovers that his girlfriend, Penelope, is plotting to use him to make a fortune in warfare out of jealousy towards Sly for supposedly holding them back. When Bentley objects to her goals, denounces her as a sociopath, and dumps her in disgust, Penelope attacks him in murderous rage for choosing Sly and Murray over her, forcing Bentley to fight in self-defense. Bentley survives and escapes, and the two become archenemies as Penelope embraces her newfound villainy.

See also
 Avunculicide, the killing of one's uncle
 Filicide, the killing of one's child
 Fratricide, the killing of one's brother
 Uxoricide, the killing of one's wife
 Matricide, the killing of one's mother
 Nepoticide, the killing of one's nephew
 Parricide, the killing of one's parents or another close relative
 Patricide, the killing of one's father
 Prolicide, the killing of one's offspring
 Sororicide, the killing of one's sister

References

 

Homicide
Death of men
Violence against men
 
Killings by type